Romualdo Ricardo Jiménez Oreamuno (February 6, 1859 – January 4, 1945) served as president of Costa Rica on three occasions: 1910–1914, 1924–1928 and 1932–1936.

He was one of the best known lawyers in Costa Rican history and a University of Santo Tomás graduate. Shortly before assuming power in 1910, the province of Cartago was hit by a powerful earthquake which destroyed most of the city and killed hundreds. One of his main struggles was the rebuilding of the biggest city in the country at the time. After the earthquake, Jiménez outlawed construction with adobe.  Another notable aspect of his first term was the consolidation of the country's external debt with a great part of the debt owed to France being repaid.

During his second term in office, he created the National Insurance Bank, The Bank of Mortgage Credit, the School of Agriculture and founded the Ministry of Health. He also began the electrification of the Pacific railway system and the creation of the Pacific port of Puntarenas. After his second term, he stepped away from the political scene for four years.

He was again elected President in 1932. During his last term in office he concentrated on the country's infrastructure and educational system. He built several large buildings for school housing, improved and built new roads throughout the country and constructed an aqueduct system that started in the central valley at Ojo de Agua that flowed into the Pacific Ocean at Puntarenas. During his administration, the bridge from Filadelfia and Liberia was constructed, as was the Old National Theater.

He died in San José on 4 January 1945.

His father was the two-time president Jesús Jiménez.

References

1859 births
1945 deaths
People from Cartago Province
Presidents of Costa Rica
Vice presidents of Costa Rica
Children of national leaders
Foreign ministers of Costa Rica
Supreme Court of Justice of Costa Rica judges
Costa Rican agnostics
Costa Rican liberals